The German-Arab Friendship Association (DAFG) is a non-profit association established in 2007 with headquarters in Berlin. It works in the fields of economic, political, cultural and media cooperation between Germany and the countries of the Arab World. The DAFG is a non-partisan initiative and does not take a role as political actor or take sides in political conflicts. The DAFG works with civil society organisations, political foundations as well as government agencies and the Arab states’ embassies in Germany.

References 

Non-profit organisations based in Berlin
2007 establishments in Germany
Organizations established in 2007